The Teams event of the tournament 2016 BWF World Junior Championships is held on November 2–6. The defending champions of the last edition is China.

Group stage

Group A

Group A1

Group A2

Group A play-offs

Group B

Group B1

Group B2

Group B play-offs

Group C

Group C1

Group C2

Group C play-offs

Group D

Group D1

Group D2

Group D play-offs

Group E

Group E1

Group E2

Group E play-offs

Group F

Group F1

Group F2

Group F play-offs

Group G

Group G1

Group G2

Group G play-offs

Group H

Group H1

Group H2

Group H play-offs

Final stage

1st to 8th

1st to 8th quarterfinals

5th to 8th semifinals

1st to 4th semifinals

7th-8th place match

5th-6th place match

Final

9th to 16th

9th to 16th quarterfinals

13th to 16th semifinals

9th to 12th semifinals

15th-16th place match

13th-14th place match

11th-12th place match

9th-10th place match

17th to 24th

25th to 32nd

33rd to 40th

41st to 48th

49th to 52nd

References
BWF World Junior Mixed Team Championships 2016

Teams
World Junior